John Selwyn Moll (1913 – 24 July 1942) was an English banker, British Army officer and rugby union player born in Greenwich, London. He worked as a banker for Lloyds Bank and played club rugby for Lloyds Bank RFC and Blackheath and played for the British Lions on their 1936 tour to Argentina as a centre. He was killed during the Second World War whilst at Bury St. Edmunds, Suffolk.

Rugby career 
Moll was born in Greenwich and was educated at Bedford School. After playing rugby for the school, he worked for Lloyds Bank and played for the bank's rugby club. In 1936, despite never being called up for the England national rugby union team, he was called up to play for the British Lions on their tour of Argentina. Upon returning, in 1938 he played rugby for Blackheath in Kent and played County Championship rugby representing Kent. He also played for the Barbarians in 1939. During the Second World War, he played rugby sevens for Rossyln Park.

Military career 
Moll was a member of the Army Cadet Force whilst at Bedford School and upon leaving he joined the Northumberland Hussars regiment of the Territorial Army.  When the Second World War started in 1939, Moll signed up for the Royal Engineers. In 1940, he was commissioned as an officer in the Queen's Royal Regiment (West Surrey). Later he would be commissioned as a captain in the Regiment. In 1942, he died as a result of an accident in Bury St Edmunds whilst his Regiment was training for deployment to Iraq. Details of his death were not released however he was declared as having "died of wounds received on active service" by Lieutenant T. E. Redfern, a fellow rugby player from Rossyln Park. He was listed on the regiment's Roll of Honour. He was buried at Christ Church, Shamley Green in Surrey. A memorial plaque dedicated to Moll was also installed inside the church.

References

External links 
 British and Irish Lions profile

1913 births
1942 deaths
Burials in Surrey
English rugby union players
British & Irish Lions rugby union players from England
Barbarian F.C. players
Blackheath F.C. players
Lloyds Banking Group people
Royal Engineers soldiers
Northumberland Hussars soldiers
Queen's Royal Regiment officers
Accidental deaths in England
British Army personnel killed in World War II
English bankers
Rugby union players from Greenwich
Rosslyn Park F.C. players
English rugby sevens players
People educated at Bedford School
Military personnel from London